The Last Cartridges (French: Les Dernières Cartouches) is an 1873 painting by the French artist Alphonse de Neuville.

It recreates an incident of the Franco-Prussian War, when the French defenders of Bazeilles fought to the last cartridge during the 1870 Battle of Sedan. The fighting at Bazeilles was celebrated by the French nation as a moral victory amidst an otherwise catastrophic defeat.

See also
 The Last Cartridges, an 1897 film inspired by the painting

References

Bibliography
 Fermer, Douglas. Sedan 1870: The Eclipse of France. Pen and Sword, 2016.
 Thomson, Richard. The Troubled Republic: Visual Culture and Social Debate in France, 1889-1900. Yale University Press, 2004.

Paintings by Alphonse de Neuville
1873 paintings
War paintings